Maksim Aleksandrovich Proshin (born 13 February 1976) is a former Russian professional football player.

Club career
He played eight seasons in the Russian Football National League for seven different clubs.

External links
 

1976 births
Living people
Russian footballers
Association football midfielders
FC Baltika Kaliningrad players
FC Metallurg Lipetsk players
FC Volgar Astrakhan players
FC SKA-Khabarovsk players
FC Torpedo NN Nizhny Novgorod players
FC Avangard Kursk players
FC Dynamo Saint Petersburg players
FC Petrotrest players
FC Lokomotiv Saint Petersburg players
FC Sever Murmansk players
FC Zenit-2 Saint Petersburg players